50 Aquarii, abbreviated 50 Aqr, is a single star in the zodiac constellation of Aquarius. 50 Aquarii is its Flamsteed designation. It is a faint star with an apparent visual magnitude of 5.76 that is barely visible to the naked eye under good seeing conditions. The star is located near the ecliptic and thus is subject to lunar occultations. It is moving closer to the Earth with a heliocentric radial velocity of −21 km/s.

This is an evolved giant star with a stellar classification of G7.5 III that is most likely (87% chance) on the red giant branch. As such, it is estimated to be 620 million years old with 2.5 times the mass of the Sun and has expanded to 14 times the Sun's radius. The star is radiating 104 times the Sun's luminosity from its expanded photosphere at an effective temperature of 4,897 K.

References

G-type giants
Aquarius (constellation)
Durchmusterung objects
Aquarii, 050
212430
110602
8534